Johann Georg Bach (30 September 1751 – 12 April 1797) was a German organist.

A member of the Bach family, he was born in Eisenach, the son of Johann Ernst Bach. From 1777 he was organist at Georgenkirche in Eisenach, where he died.

References

Johann Georg
18th-century keyboardists
German classical organists
German male organists
1751 births
1797 deaths
Male classical organists